Angus Dawson (born 30 Oct 2000) is an Australian representative rower. He is an Australian national champion and twice an U23 world champion (in 2019 and 2022).  He was a 2021 Tokyo Olympian where he rowed in the Australian men's eight.

Club and state rowing
Raised in rural South Australia at Dingabledinga, Dawson was schooled at St Peter's College were he took up rowing. His senior club rowing started from the Adelaide Rowing Club.

Dawson's state representative debut for South Australia came in 2017 when still aged sixteen he was selected in the state youth eight to contest the Noel Wilkinson trophy at the Interstate Regatta. He was again selected in the South Australian youth eight in 2018. That year he won an U19 national title in the double scull with Mitchell Reinhard. In 2019 he was selected in the South Australian men's senior eight to contest the Kings Cup.

In 2020 Dawson studied at UC Berkeley and rowed in the Berkeley varsity eight. He returned to Australia due to Covid concerns and entered the Australian senior men's squad. In 2021 he again rowed in the South Australian King's Cup eight  and that year he won an open men's coxless pair national championship title with his South Australian team-mate Alexander Hill.

International representative rowing
Dawson made his Australian representative debut at the 2019 World Rowing U23 Championships in Sarasota-Bradenton, USA when he was selected in the two seat of the Australian coxed four which rowed to victory and a world championship gold medal 

Following his return to Australia in 2021 and before national team selections for the delayed Tokyo Olympics, Dawson had forced his way into the Australian men's eight, which had qualified for the Olympics on 2019 international performances. In Tokyo the Australian men's eight placed fourth in their heat, fourth in the repechage and sixth in the Olympic A final. The Australian mens's eight finished 8.27 seconds behind 5th place with a disappointing performance for the crew, well off the pace of the rest of the crews in the race.

In March 2022 Dawson was selected into the men's sweep squad within the broader Australian training team to prepare for the 2022 international season and the 2022 World Rowing Championships.  

Leading up to the 2022 World Rowing U23 Championships Dawson stroked the U23 men's eight competing as an Australia 2 crew at the World Rowing Cup III in Lucerne. Two weeks later in that crew he won a gold medal at the U23 World Championships in Varese.

References

2000 births
Living people
Australian male rowers
Rowers at the 2020 Summer Olympics
Olympic rowers of Australia
21st-century Australian people